The Johnston snake eel (Schultzidia johnstonensis), also known as the peppered worm eel in Micronesia and Hawaii is an eel in the family Ophichthidae (worm/snake eels). It was described by Leonard Peter Schultz and Loren Paul Woods in 1949. It is a marine, tropical eel, which is known from the Indo-Pacific region, including the Chagos Islands, Hawaii, the Marquesan Islands, the Society Islands, Australia, and New Caledonia. It dwells at a depth range of 2–23 m, and inhabits sand sediments in coral reefs. It can reach a maximum total length of 35 cm.

The Johnston snake eel's diet consists of crabs, prawns, and small finfish.

References

Ophichthidae
Fish described in 1949